Swanee River is a 1931 American musical drama film directed by Raymond Cannon and starring Grant Withers, Thelma Todd and Philo McCullough. It is now considered a lost film.

Synopsis
An energy company plans to flood a Tennessee Valley in order to construct a new hydro power plant. Northern engineer Garry arrives in the area to oversee the project. He falls in love with Caroline, the adopted daughter of local landowner Colonel Bradford but makes an enemy of the Colonel's nephew Jack. Jack kills the Colonel during a dispute and tries to frame Garry. He then destroys a dam which leads to Caroline being trapped in a cave until she is rescued by Garry.

Cast
 Grant Withers as Garry
 Thelma Todd as 	Caroline
 Philo McCullough as 	Jack Bradford
 Walter Miller as Morton
 Palmer Morrison as Colonel Bradford
 Robert Frazier as 	Esau
 The Russell Wooding's Jubilee Singers as Singers

References

Bibliography
 Munden, Kenneth White. The American Film Institute Catalog of Motion Pictures Produced in the United States, Part 1. University of California Press, 1997.
 Pitts, Michael R. Poverty Row Studios, 1929–1940. McFarland & Company, 2005.

External links
 

1931 films
1931 musical films
1931 drama films
American musical films
American drama films
Films directed by Raymond Cannon
American black-and-white films
Films set in Tennessee
1930s English-language films
1930s American films